Basanta Kumar Panda is a leader of Bharatiya Janata Party from Odisha, India. He was a member of the Odisha Legislative Assembly for Nuapada and president of state unit of the party. Currently he is elected as a Member of Parliament of Lok Sabha from Kalahandi.

References

1961 births
Living people
Members of the Odisha Legislative Assembly
Bharatiya Janata Party politicians from Odisha
People from Nuapada district
India MPs 2019–present
Odisha MLAs 2000–2004
Odisha MLAs 2014–2019